Michael Potter (born 6 November 1997 in Hornsby, New South Wales) is an Australian cyclist, who most recently rode for UCI Continental team .

Major results
2018
 1st  Overall Tour de Tochigi
1st Stages 1 & 2
1st  Young rider classification
 3rd Road race, National Under-23 Road Championships
 5th Overall New Zealand Cycle Classic
 9th Oita Urban Classic

References

External links

1997 births
Living people
Australian male cyclists